Model M keyboards are a group of computer keyboards designed and manufactured by IBM starting in 1985, and later by Lexmark International, Maxi Switch, and Unicomp.  The keyboard's many variations have their own distinct characteristics, with the vast majority having a buckling-spring key design and swappable keycaps. Model M keyboards are notable among computer enthusiasts and frequent typists due to their durability, typing-feel consistency, and their tactile and auditory feedback.

The popularity of the IBM PC and its successors made the Model M's design influential: Almost all later general-purpose computer keyboards mimicked its key layout and other aspects of its ergonomics. The layout was standardized by ISO in 1994 and ANSI in 1998, with minor additions—most notably the Windows key and Menu key.

The Model M is regarded as a classic and durable piece of hardware. Although the computers and computer peripherals produced concurrently with them are considered obsolete, many Model M keyboards are still in use due to their physical durability and the continued validity of their ANSI 101-key and ISO 102-key layouts, through the use of a PS/2-female-to-USB-male adapter with a built-in level converter. Since their original popularity, new generations have discovered their unique functionality and aesthetics.

It is estimated that during the IBM and Lexmark years, over 10 million Model Ms were shipped. Their mass-market success ended in the 1990s amid an industry-wide switchover to lower-cost dome-switch keyboards. IBM stopped producing the Model M keyboard in 1996.

History 

The Model M keyboard was designed to be less expensive to produce than the Model F keyboard it replaced. Principal design work was done at IBM in 19831984, drawing on a wide range of user feedback, ergonomic studies, and examination of competing products. Its key layout, significantly different from the Model F's, owed much (including notably the inverted-T arrangement of its arrow keys) to the LK-201 keyboard shipped with the VT220 serial terminal.

Production of Model M keyboards began in 1985. They were often bundled with new IBM computers. While today primarily associated with the IBM PC and its successors, it actually first shipped with the 3161 terminal and was deployed across several other IBM product lines as well, notably including the 5250 terminal and the RS/6000.

They were produced at IBM plants in Lexington, Kentucky; Greenock, Scotland; and Guadalajara, Mexico. The most common variant is the IBM Enhanced Keyboard identified by IBM assembly part number 1391401, the U.S. English layout keyboard bundled with the IBM Personal System/2. Until around 1993, most Model Ms included a sturdy, coiled, detachable cable, with either an AT (pre-1987) or PS/2 connector, in 5- and 10-foot lengths (1.5 and 3 metres). From about 1994 onwards, flat non-detachable cables were used to reduce manufacturing costs; however, IBM retained its 101-key layout, never implementing the Microsoft Windows keys common on other keyboards from that time. Unicomp later designed a 104-key Model M with Windows keys.

On March 27, 1991, IBM divested a number of its hardware manufacturing operations, including keyboard production, forming Lexmark International. Lexmark continued manufacturing Model M keyboards in the United States, United Kingdom, and Mexico, with IBM as their major customer. Many of these keyboards are identified by IBM assembly part numbers 52G9658, 52G9700, 71G4644, 82G2383, and 42H1292, which were bundled with IBM PS/ValuePoint and IBM PC Series.

Over the next four years, cost pressure led to several minor design changes intended to lower the part and fabrication costs of Lexmark Model Ms. The case and metal backplate were repeatedly lightened. The cable jack and detachable SDL cable were replaced with a fixed cable. Some variants were made with a single color for key legends.

In 1995 Lexmark made the most sweeping design change in the Model M's history, altering the size and location of the internal controller board. While the new "press-fit" design successfully lowered manufacturing costs by eliminating the two ribbon cables and separate LED daughterboard of older versions, the controller's new card-edge connector proved to be a failure point that shortened the keyboard's average lifetime. The classic era of the Model M is generally considered to have ended with this change, though a few on the older pattern continued to be made at Greenock and Guadalajara until 1999. Relatively few press-fit model Ms have survived.

During the Lexmark years, a few Model M variants were manufactured with rubber-dome keyswitches rather than buckling springs. Due to these switches' comparatively short durability, few of these variants have survived. Despite their rarity, today's enthusiasts and collectors do not value them nearly as highly as the more common buckling-spring variants.

A five-year agreement obligating IBM to purchase nearly all of its keyboards from Lexmark expired on March 27, 1996. Lexmark exited the keyboard business, selling related assets to IBM and Maxi Switch. When Lexmark discontinued keyboard production in April 1996, IBM continued producing buckling-spring Model M's in Scotland until 1999. Maxi Switch purchased assets for rubber-dome keyboards and the Lexmark Select-Ease Keyboard (model M15), including a buckling-spring switch patent. They continued to manufacture the IBM Enhanced Keyboard with TrackPoint II (model M13) in Mexico until 1998.

Some of Lexmark's keyboard manufacturing assets were also sold to a group of Lexmark employees, who formed Unicomp whose basic version of the Model M was similar to part number 42H1292, first renamed 42H1292U and later the Customizer. There have been other configurations, including updated 104- and 105-key layouts; a Unix layout (where the Ctrl, Caps Lock, Esc, and tilde keys are transposed); models with integrated pointing sticks and trackballs; and POS-specific models such as those with built-in magstripe readers. All used the press-fit controller characteristic of late Lexmarks.

Unicomp continued to use the original IBM machinery to produce Model Ms, leading to a gradual decline in quality as the tooling became worn. This, and various problems with their USB controllers helped keep a market for vintage Model Ms thriving. In 2020 Unicomp replaced its tooling and shipped a "New Model M" with noticeably improved build quality that more closely resembles the classic 1391401 (though with a 104- or 103-key layout and USB); many older variants are no longer sold on Unicomp's website and some still on sale have been deprecated.

Variations 
The Model M's numerous variations (referred to as "part numbers") incorporated alternative features and/or colors. One of the more sought after variants of the Model M keyboard is the Space Saving Keyboard, which integrates the number pad into the keyboard's main section, substantially reducing its width. The Space Saving Keyboard is likely the origin of the keyboard layout that is generally known as a "tenkeyless keyboard."

IBM released the standard and Space Saving Model M's in an alternative 'gray/pebble' color for use with their Industrial computers, designed to conceal discoloration from handling in production environments. Other variable features include a grounded spacebar and, on some later models, drainage holes to deter damage from spilled liquids.

The M2 was a late Lexmark variation issued under cost pressure from competing rubber-dome keyboards. Some revisions used rubber-dome switches; others retained buckling springs. All had a much thinner, lighter case and discarded the metal backplate. It can easily be distinguished from the original Model M design by its flat, unsculpted front case section; also the manufacturing label, if present, says "M2" rather than "M." M2s were poorly fabricated and notoriously unreliable; comparatively few survived into the 21st century, and Model M enthusiasts do not value them.

The M2 should in turn be distinguished from the M5, another Lexmark variant which returned to the rugged Model M case/backplate construction but added a built-in trackball; and those two from the M13, which was also built like rugged Model Ms but featured a pointing stick. The M5 and M13 designs are still carried by Unicomp in 2021 under the names Trackball Classic and Endura Pro.

Design 

The variant most commonly referred to as "Model M" is Part No. 1391401, on which many other variants were based. This model, known as the Enhanced Keyboard, included IBM's patented buckling spring design and swappable keycaps.

The Model M's design has been widely praised as durable and reliable, and has remained basically the same since the 1980s, while virtually all other computing hardware, from PCs to monitors to mice, has changed dramatically. The M's design, including its heavy steel backplate and strong plastic frame, has allowed many early Model M Keyboards to still be functional with no modification nearly four decades later.

The Model M's buckling spring key design gives it a unique feel and sound. Unlike more common dome switch designs, buckling springs give users a notable tactile and auditory feedback. Because of its more defined touch, some users report they can type faster and more accurately on the Model M than on other keyboards. Additionally, many model M enthusiasts believe that tactile-feedback keyboards like the model M reduce stress on the hands, preventing or even reversing Repetitive Strain Injury. The key presses require strong pressure and a pronounced sound, meant to help typists previously trained on typewriters who had become accustomed to that level of feedback. This resulted in the Model M sometimes being referred to as the "clicky keyboard."

Unlike competitors such as Cherry and Alps-style keyswitches, buckling-spring keyswitches do not have a plunger part with sliding surfaces that can be fouled by contaminants. This makes Model Ms much more resistant to dirt, dust, and grit, and is a significant factor in their long service lifetimes and appeal in challenging industrial environments.

Until the late fourth-generation variants, most Model Ms were manufactured with a 1.25" slotted, circular speaker grille in their bottom surfaces. Relatively few contain an actual speaker, however, which was useful only for sounding beep codes on older terminal systems. The most common P/Ns with speakers are 1394540 and 51G872, made for RS/6000 UNIX workstations.

Model Ms have been manufactured to quite a number of different interface and connector standards, some of which (such as the 5-pin DIN used on 5250 terminals) are poorly documented and have had to be reverse-engineered by enthusiasts. Early variants shipped with the PC XT and AT used connectors specific to those systems.  After the introduction of the PS/2 most shipped with a connector for a PS/2 port; these included the 1391401. Unicomp introduced support for USB.

Older model Ms used a detachable cable with an SDL connector on the keyboard, later Lexmark and Unicomp variants used a fixed cable, and one very recent variant from Unicomp has a detachable cable with an uncommon locking variant of the USB Type A jack on the keyboard.

Features by part number 
Layout types:
101 – ANSI layout, the model M's original.
102 – International layout with additional key between Z and a half-sized left shift, AltGr in place of right Alt, usually with ISO-style long Enter.
103 – ANSI layout with one Super key and one Menu key, long spacebar.
104 – ANSI layout plus two Windows keys and one Menu key, short spacebar.
122 – IBM terminal layout with extra function keys and left-side function pad.
84 – Tenkeyless version of the 101-key ANSI layout.
87 – Tenkeyless version of the 104-key ANSI layout.

Logo position legend:

LC – Left Corner
RC – Right Corner
LLC – Lower Left Corner
LRC – Lower Right Corner
ULC – Upper Left Corner
URC – Upper Right Corner
LLP – Lock-Light Panel

Click [show] to display the table's contents.

Note: Manufacture dates are approximate.

Gallery

See also 
 IBM PC keyboard
 Model F keyboard
 List of mechanical keyboards

References

External links 

  – another guide to Model M history and variants
  – Interoperability problems with modern hardware.
  – current Model M manufacturer
 
  – a Model M restoration guide
  – Comprehensive review

Computer keyboard models
IBM personal computers